Cody Rudkowsky (born July 21, 1978) is a Canadian retired ice hockey goaltender who played eight seasons in the American Hockey League and ECHL, and played in a single game for the St. Louis Blues of the National Hockey League in 2002–03.  He was the Most Valuable Player of the Western Hockey League in 1999.

AHL and ECHL
Born  in Willingdon, Alberta, Rudkowsky spent most of his career in the ECHL. He backstopped the Reading Royals to a career high 46 games played in 2003-04 and led the Royals to the Kelly Cup semi-finals that season. On December 31, 2005, Rudkowsky was named starting goaltender for the American Conference in the 14th annual ECHL All-Star Game

Rudkowsky was signed to a professional tryout contract (PTO) by the Grand Rapids Griffins on October 26, 2007. On October 28, he would come in relief for starting goaltender Adam Berkhoel and stop 8 of 9 shots that night. The Griffins would lose that game 7–1. On February 15, 2008, he was signed again to a PTO by Grand Rapids and made a brief appearance (3m 21sec) against the Milwaukee Admirals.

Other leagues
It was announced on 27 August 2009 that Rudkowsky signed a contract to play for the Edinburgh Capitals in the British Elite Ice Hockey League for the 09/10 Season. This was the first time Rudkowsky played for a team outside North America.

Rudkowsky also briefly played for the Bentley Generals in amateur Allan Cup play during the 2008–09 season and was first star of the final game of the 2008-09 Allan Cup Finals.

Awards and achievements
 Named to the WHL West First All-Star Team in 1999

References

External links

1978 births
Living people
Bridgeport Sound Tigers players
Canadian ice hockey goaltenders
Ice hockey people from Alberta
Langley Thunder players
Peoria Rivermen (ECHL) players
Phoenix RoadRunners players
Providence Bruins players
Reading Royals players
St. Louis Blues players
Seattle Thunderbirds players
Trenton Titans players
Undrafted National Hockey League players
Worcester IceCats players
Edinburgh Capitals players
Canadian expatriate ice hockey players in England
Canadian expatriate ice hockey players in Scotland